Ingliston is an area in the west of Edinburgh, near Maybury, South Gyle and Newbridge, and is home to Edinburgh Airport and The Royal Highland Showground.

History
The name Ingliston either means the "settlement of the Inglis Family" or "English town".

From 1965 to 1994 motor racing took place at Ingliston Racing Circuit, which was located within the Royal Highland Showground.

From 1973 to 2005, a Sunday market was held at Ingliston. It was of one of the biggest open air markets in Europe. For many years, a feature of the market was a  statue of King Kong by Nicholas Monro.

Ingliston Golf Club first appeared in the 1930s. The 18-hole parkland course closed in the 1960s and is now the site of the Royal Highland Show Ground.

Park and Ride
In 2006, the Ingliston Park and Ride site was opened and is one of a network of park and ride service around Edinburgh. A new tram stop on the Airport - York Place route operated by Edinburgh Trams opened at the end of May 2014.

References
 Bell, Raymond MacKean Literary Corstorphine: A reader's guide to West Edinburgh, Leamington Books, Edinburgh 2017

External links
Ingliston Park & Ride information on Edinburgh Trams

Edinburgh Trams stops
Areas of Edinburgh
Ingliston Park and Ride Tram Stop